National Police Hospital is a station on Line 3 of the Seoul Metropolitan Subway located in Songpa-gu, Seoul. On February 18, 2010, it was opened as part of an eastward extension of Line 3.

Station layout

References 

Railway stations opened in 2010
Seoul Metropolitan Subway stations
Metro stations in Songpa District
Seoul Subway Line 3